Hannes Hegen (real name Johannes Eduard Hegenbarth; 16 May 1925 – 8 November 2014) was a German illustrator and caricaturist and is most famous for creating the East German comic book Mosaik and its original protagonists, the Digedags.

Biography
Hegen was born in Böhmisch Kamnitz, now Česká Kamenice.  He studied at the University of Applied Arts Vienna and at the Academy of Visual Arts Leipzig. After his studies, he worked in Berlin, illustrating several magazines.

His own creation Mosaik was first published in December 1955. Hegen was solely responsible for only the first issues of the book. Later a team of artists and writers worked on the book, but only Hegen was credited on the cover. 223 issues were produced. Hegen worked on Mosaik until 1975, when he had a disagreement with the publisher and quit working, taking the rights to the Digedags characters with him. The Mosaik team continued without him and created new characters to appear in Mosaik.

Hegen died in Berlin, aged 89, still working on reprint and book editions for the original Mosaik comics.

In 2008 Hannes Hegen received the Max & Moritz Prize, the most important German prize for comic artists from the International Comic Salon Erlangen. In 2010 he was awarded for his creative work, the Order of Merit of the Federal Republic of Germany (Knight's Cross, or Merit Cross on Ribbon, German: Verdienstkreuz am Bande).

Books 
 Reiner Grünberg; Michael Hebestreit: MOSAIK-Handbuch. Die Welt der Digedags. Lehmstedt Verlag, Leipzig 2012, .
 Mark Lehmstedt: Die geheime Geschichte der Digedags. Die Publikations- und Zensurgeschichte des Mosaik von Hannes Hegen. Lehmstedt Verlag, Leipzig 2010, .
 Matthias Friske: Die Geschichte des „MOSAIK von Hannes Hegen“. Eine Comic-Legende in der DDR. Lukas-Verlag, Berlin 2008, .
 Michael F. Scholz: Mosaik. Die ersten Jahre. in Eckart Sackmann: Deutsche Comicforschung. Vol. 2, Verlag Sackmann und Hörndl, Hildesheim 2005, pages 102–111.

External links
 

 Hannes Hegen at the MosaPedia
 Hannes Hegen in Comiclopedia (English)
 website about Hannes Hegen
 Stefan Pannor: DDR-Comic „Mosaik“: Die drei kleinen Fluchthelfer in Spiegel Online
 Andreas Platthaus: Comics in der DDR: Die Kobolde und ihr Pionier in Frankfurter Allgemeine Zeitung
 Andreas Platthaus: Die Rückkehr von Dig, Dag und Digedag. in Frankfurter Allgemeine Zeitung, 14 July 2009
 Matthias Dell: Das letzte Abenteuer der Digedags. in Der Freitag (Newspaper), 8 July 2009
 Thomas Kramer: Auf zu Lord Groggy nach England. in Der Freitag (Newspaper), 27 December 2002

References

German illustrators
German caricaturists
German comics artists
German comics writers
Recipients of the Cross of the Order of Merit of the Federal Republic of Germany
Sudeten German people
German people of German Bohemian descent
People from Děčín District
1925 births
2014 deaths
German male writers